The London, Brighton and South Coast Railway (LB&SCR) B2 class was a class of small 4-4-0 steam locomotives intended for express passenger work on the LB&SCR London to Portsmouth line.  They were designed by R. J. Billinton and built at Brighton works from 1895 to 1897.  They proved to be reliable locomotives but barely adequate for the heaviest trains and acquired the nickname Grasshoppers.  As a result the B3 class was developed from the B2, and the B2X class was later rebuilt from these locomotives with larger boilers.

History
When R. J. Billinton took over as chief mechanical engineer of the LB&SCR in 1890, following the sudden death of William Stroudley, the London to Brighton trains were adequately served by Stroudley's Gladstone class but the lighter Portsmouth expresses were beginning to struggle behind his G class singles. Billinton therefore designed a small 4-4-0, specifically for these services. However, during the course of 1892-1893 the London-to-Brighton trains began to increase in weight, and the board of governors of the railway agreed to invest money in larger turntables and so Billinton was able to enlarge his design further to make them more generally useful.

Three locomotives appeared in 1895, with a further eight in 1896 and fourteen in 1897. They were named after famous politicians, bankers and railway engineers. The new design was clearly influenced by the locomotives of Samuel Waite Johnson on the Midland Railway, for whom Billinton had previously worked, and were the first LB&SCR locomotives to have leading bogie wheels. It incorporated Billinton's C2 class boiler. They proved to be adequate for the lightly loaded Portsmouth express trains but barely so for heavier trains. They also tended to ride unevenly and consequently acquired the nickname of grasshoppers by their crews.

B3 and B2X classes
As a result of the complaints about the use of the class on the Brighton line, Billinton fitted the last locomotive in the class No. 213 Bessemer, with a larger boiler when new, which thereafter became known as the B3  class. This caused a slight improvement in performance but not one significant enough to alter the entire class at that time. However, once the original boilers were worn out, it became more of an economic proposition to do so. Thus between October 1907 and 1910, Billinton's successor Douglas Earle Marsh rebuilt the entire class (including 213 Bessemer) with the improved boiler used on his C3 class, thereby creating the B2X class.

The rebuilt locomotives were a significant improvement in both looks and performance and were used on the heaviest expresses to Portsmouth and Hastings and semi-fast trains on the Brighton line.

Post-grouping 

All 25 locomotives were still in regular use in December 1922, at the grouping of the railways of southern England to form the Southern Railway. The class continued to find useful work on secondary passenger services between London and the south coast until 1929, when the impending electrification of the Brighton line began to make them redundant. They were thus all withdrawn between June 1929 and March 1933, and none have survived in preservation.

Accidents and incidents
On 9 July 1928, B2X locomotive No. B210 was in a sidelong collision with an electric multiple unit at  due to the driver misreading signals. Two people were killed and nine were injured, six seriously.

Locomotive summary

References

4-4-0 locomotives
B2
Railway locomotives introduced in 1895
Scrapped locomotives
Standard gauge steam locomotives of Great Britain